Scott Marion Loftin (September 14, 1878September 22, 1953) was a U.S. Senator from Florida who served as a Democrat in 1936.

Loftin was born in Montgomery, Montgomery County, Alabama. At the age of nine, he moved to Pensacola, Florida, with his parents in 1887. He attended the public schools and Washington and Lee University School of Law at Lexington, Virginia. He was admitted to the bar in 1899 and commenced practice in Pensacola, Florida. Loftin was a member of the Florida House of Representatives between 1903-1905 and was prosecuting attorney of Escambia County, Florida between 1904 and 1917. He moved to Jacksonville, Florida, in 1917 to continue the practice of law.

Loftin became a member of the Attorney General's Advisory Committee on Crime in 1934 and president of the American Bar Association in 1934. He became a general counsel for the Florida East Coast Railway between 1931-1941 and for a variety of other transportation-related businesses. He was a businessman with interests in railroads, shipping, and newspapers.

On May 26, 1936, he was appointed as a Democrat to the United States Senate to fill the vacancy caused by the death of Park Trammell and served from May 26 to November 3, 1936, when a successor was elected. Loftin was not a candidate for election to fill the vacancy. He resumed the practice of law in Jacksonville, Fla., until his death in Highlands, North Carolina.

External links 
 Portrait of Scott M. Loftin, president of the American Bar Association, Los Angeles, California, 1935. Los Angeles Times Photographic Archive (Collection 1429). UCLA Library Special Collections, Charles E. Young Research Library, University of California, Los Angeles.

1878 births
1953 deaths
Florida Democrats
Democratic Party United States senators from Florida
Washington and Lee University School of Law alumni
Presidents of the American Bar Association